"Renegade" is a song recorded by American indie band Big Red Machine featuring American singer-songwriter Taylor Swift, released on July 2, 2021, by 37D03D and Jagjaguwar. It was serviced to US triple-A radio on the same day as the third single from the band's second studio album, How Long Do You Think It's Gonna Last? (2021).

"Renegade" is an upbeat tune blending indie pop, folk, and alternative styles, driven by guitar, drums and strings. It was written by Swift and Aaron Dessner, and produced by the latter. Swift performs the lead vocals, complemented by Justin Vernon's backing vocals. Its subject matter discusses the toxic effects one's fears and mental health issues can have on their personal relationships, and the resulting confusion and indecision. It depicts the narrator's frustration with their emotionally fortified partner, and the former's efforts to confront and help the latter. Music critics acclaimed the song, with emphasis on its sharp lyrics and instrumentation.

Marking Big Red Machine's first entry in all of the record charts it appeared on, "Renegade" charted in Australia, Canada, Ireland, New Zealand, the United Kingdom and the United States. The song reached the top 10 of the UK Independent Singles and the US Hot Rock & Alternative Songs charts.

Background and release

American singer-songwriter Taylor Swift collaborated with Aaron Dessner, the guitarist of American indie rock band the National, and Justin Vernon, the vocalist of Bon Iver, on her eighth and ninth studio albums released in 2020, Folklore and Evermore, respectively. In a December 2020 interview for Rolling Stone, Dessner said that Swift had been writing songs for the upcoming project of Big Red Machine, a band consisting of Dessner and Vernon; two of those songs, "Dorothea" and "Closure", ended up appearing on the track-listing of Evermore instead. Dessner further produced two tracks on Swift's 2021 re-recording, Fearless (Taylor's Version). Two songs—"Renegade" and "Birch"—were recorded by Swift for Big Red Machine, at her Los Angeles home studio, Kitty Committee, in the week ending March 19, 2021, the same week Swift and Dessner had won Album of the Year for Folklore at the 63rd Annual Grammy Awards. Vernon recorded additional vocals at his studio, April Base.

On April 13, 2021, Vernon previewed new music on his Instagram account, in which he shared a brief clip of a forthcoming collaboration with Swift, saying "that's the awesome Taylor one. I think this should be the single". On June 27, 2021, a cryptic teaser was posted to Big Red Machine's social media. It depicted videos of Vernon and Dessner, and shots of Swift's penning lyrics. On June 29, 2021, the band revealed their second studio album, How Long Do You Think It's Gonna Last?, its release date, cover artwork and track listing; "Birch" and "Renegade" placed fourth and fifth in the list, respectively, featuring Swift's vocals on both. "Latter Days" featuring Anaïs Mitchell was released as the lead single on the same day, followed by "The Ghost of Cincinnati" on the next day. "Renegade" was released as the next single on July 2, 2021, impacting U.S. adult album alternative radio on the same day. Another teaser was posted to the band's social media on July 1, 2021, a 14-second long snippet with Swift's vocals, captioned with a link to a YouTube video that premiered at midnight EDT, the lyric video of "Renegade" directed by Michael Brown. "Renegade" was serviced to the U.S. adult contemporary radio as well, on July 12, 2021. On August 17, a pop version of the song was released.

Composition and lyrics 

A renegade is someone who has rejected lawful or conventional behavior. Addressed in second person, "Renegade" has the narrator describe how the subject's anxiety and fear are obstacles for the narrator's love for the subject. The song ends with the question "Is it insensitive for me to say, get your shit together so I can love you?", with the outcome remaining uncertain. "Renegade" is set in a C major key. Swift's vocals range between E3 and G4. It has a fast tempo of 168 beats per minute.

"Renegade" is performed by Swift as the lead vocalist, backed by Vernon's additional vocals. The song was written by Dessner and Swift. Dessner stated he was emotionally struck the first time he heard Swift talk about "how anxiety and fear get in the way of loving someone or create an inability for someone to love". Renegade sums up that emotion with a "fairly experimental" sound. It is an upbeat, alternative indie, indie pop, indie folk, and folk pop song with strings by Dessner and drums by So Percussion's Jason Treuting. Swift's vocal delivery is wordy, punctuated by brief plucks of gentle acoustic guitar and "rolling" synthesizers. The song ends with a polyphony of layered harmonies of Swift and Vernon.

Critical reception 
Spin critic Josh Chesler called "Renegade" an indie pop "banger", Lauren Huff of Entertainment Weekly dubbed it an earworm, and Variety Jonathan Cohen said the song continued "the more musically adventurous vein" of Swift's latest work with Dessner, using emotionally stirring couplets. Robin Murray, wiring for Clash, dubbed the song " love-struck melodrama" with "piercing" lyrics. Nina Corcoran of Consequence wrote that "Renegade" is a "folk-pop earworm" with Swift's "future classic" lyrics. Mary Siroky of the same publication said that the song's focus is "someone refusing to let love in", about "how many times someone can be turned away while waiting patiently for the subject of their affection to realize it's ok to ask for help, and, sometimes, for forgiveness". Siroky also praised the diction and honesty of Swift's songwriting.

NPR's Stephen Thompson stated that Swift, in the song, "stares down a relationship that's become more toxic and labor-intensive than she'd been led to expect". He highlighted the lyric "Is it insensitive for me to say, 'Get your shit together so I can love you'?" and concluded "Renegade" sounds like a Swift song featuring Big Red Machine than the band featuring her. Devon Ivie of Vulture appreciated the song's "memorable" couplets. Pitchfork rock critic Quinn Moreland said "Renegade" combines Swift's "thoughtful" 2020 songwriting with the "exploratory landscape" of Dessner and Vernon, and found the relationship described in the song as "claustrophobic and tangled in anxiety to the point of mutual destruction", filled with "frustration and indecision", juxtaposed against a "bright and warm" composition. Moreland added that Vernon and Swift’s "dueling" harmonies spiral together into "a cocoon of confusion".

Savannah Roberts of Capital FM wrote "Renegade" depicts the effects mental health issues can have on "budding" relationships, and compared its lyrical style to Swift's older songs, such as "Call It What You Want" (2017) and "The Archer" (2019). Tatiana Tenreyro, reviewing for The A.V. Club admired the indie direction of Swift's recent works, and remarked that "Renegade" does not contain the "hyper-specific details" of her 2020 albums, but "a more relatable track, one that rings true to anyone who's been with an inadequate partner." Tenreyro added that Swift "undercuts the power of the person she's addressing—the one leading her on without being able to commit—by turning the tables and forcing them to confront their shit via her lyrical zingers." Jon Pareles of The New York Times commended Swift's "melodic sense and personality", her abrupt and "symmetrical" phrases, and Dessner's production details, such as "multilayered drones, tendrils of electric and acoustic guitar", and Vernon's "distant" backing vocals. Billboard writer Jason Lipshutz said the sonic texture of "Renegade" derives from the works by the National, with its "all skittering beats and emotional warfare for adults", but Swift's imprint in that musical territory "remains thrilling, even after many months and multiple Bon Iver duets". He concluded that the song is as "satisfying" as "Exile" (2020), Swift's first duet with Vernon.

Commercial performance 
"Renegade" marked Big Red Machine's first ever entry on various charts across the globe. In the United States, the song landed at number 7 on the Billboard Hot Alternative Songs chart dated July 17, 2021, introducing Big Red Machine on the chart for the first time, and the 18th entry of Swift's career. Additionally, it debuted at number one on the Billboard Alternative Digital Songs Sales chart, marking Swift's fourth number-one song on the chart. Furthermore, the song charted at number nine on the Billboard Hot Rock & Alternative Songs chart, number 12 on Alternative Streaming Songs, and number 73 on the all-genre Hot 100. Bolstered by its three tracking days of radio airplay, the song appeared at number 34 on the Billboard Adult Pop Songs chart. On the Rolling Stone Top 100, it entered at number 90, earning 38,300 units, including 3.7 million on-demand streams.

In the United Kingdom, "Renegade" opened at number 73 on the UK Singles Chart, scoring the band's first entry on the chart. Additionally, the song landed at number 9 on the UK Independent Singles Chart. In Canada, "Renegade" landed at number 11 on the Hot Canadian Digital Song Sales chart, and number 53 on the all-genre Canadian Hot 100. Elsewhere, it debuted at number 70 on Australia's ARIA Singles Chart, number 53 on the Irish Singles Chart, and number 3 on the New Zealand Hot Singles chart. "Renegade" arrived at number 96 on the Billboard Global 200 chart.

Track listing
 Digital download and streaming
 "Renegade" (featuring Taylor Swift) – 4:14
 Spotify
 "Renegade" (featuring Taylor Swift) – 4:14
 "Ghost of Cincinnati" – 3:37
 "Latter Days" (featuring Anaïs Mitchell) – 3:58
 Digital download and streaming – pop version
 Renegade (pop version) – 3:51

Personnel 
 Taylor Swift – vocals, songwriter
 Aaron Dessner – producer, songwriter, recording engineer, drum machine, Prophet X, Mellotron, piano, bass guitar, acoustic guitar, rubber bridge guitar, OP1, synth bass, electric guitar
 Justin Vernon – vocals, electric guitar, additional producer
 Bryce Dessner – orchestration
 Jason Treuting – drums
 Jonathan Low – recording engineer, additional producer

Charts

Weekly charts

Year-end charts

Release history

References

External links
 

2021 singles
2021 songs
Big Red Machine (band)
Taylor Swift songs
Songs written by Taylor Swift
Songs written by Aaron Dessner
Song recordings produced by Aaron Dessner
Indie pop songs
Indie folk songs
American alternative rock songs
American folk songs